Todd F. Davis (born 1965) is a prize-winning American poet and critic.

Life and work

Todd F. Davis (born March 29, 1965, in Elkhart, Indiana) is Professor of English and Environmental Studies at Penn State University’s Altoona College. He is the author of five books of poetry, as well as the author or editor of several volumes of literary criticism.

The winner of the Gwendolyn Brooks Poetry Prize, awarded by the Society for the Study of Midwestern Literature, Davis has published poems in numerous national and international journals and magazines, including Poetry Daily, Verse Daily, The North American Review, The Iowa Review, The Gettysburg Review, Indiana Review, The Christian Science Monitor, Orion, Shenandoah, River Styx, Sou’wester, 5 AM, Quarterly West, Green Mountains Review, Poetry East, West Branch, Epoch, The Louisville Review, and Image.

Davis is the author of five books of poetry—Ripe (2002), Some Heaven (2007), The Least of These (2010),  Household of Water, Moon, and Snow: The Thoreau Poems (2010), and In the Kingdom of the Ditch (2013)—as well as co-editor, with Erin Murphy, of the anthology, Making Poems (2010).  Garrison Keillor has featured Davis’s poems on The Writer’s Almanac, and Ted Kooser has selected his poems to appear in the nationally syndicated American Life in Poetry column.

As literary critic, Davis is the author of several books related to ethical criticism and postmodern humanism, including Kurt Vonnegut’s Crusade, or How a Postmodern Harlequin Preached a New Kind of Humanism (2006) and, with Kenneth Womack, Postmodern Humanism in Contemporary Literature and Culture: Reconciling the Void (2006).

In 1987, Davis earned a B.A. from Grace College in Winona Lake, Indiana, and M.A. and Ph.D. degrees in English from Northern Illinois University in 1991 and 1995, respectively.

Davis lives near the village of Tipton, Pennsylvania, with his wife Shelly and their sons.

Books

Poetry 
 Winterkill (Lansing, MI: Michigan State University Press, 2016).
 In the Kingdom of the Ditch (Lansing, MI: Michigan State University Press, 2013).
 Fast Break to Line Break: Poets on the Art of Basketball (Lansing, MI: Michigan State University Press, 2012).
 The Least of These: Poems (Lansing, MI: Michigan State University Press, 2010).
 Household of Water, Moon, and Snow: The Thoreau Poems (Lewisburg, PA: Seven Kitchens Press, 2010).
 Making Poems: Forty Poems with Commentary by the Poets (Albany: State University of New York Press, 2010; co-edited with Erin Murphy).
 Some Heaven: Poems (Lansing, MI: Michigan State University Press, 2007).
 Ripe: Poems (Huron, OH: Bottom Dog Press, 2002).

Scholarship 
 Postmodern Humanism in Contemporary Literature and Culture: Reconciling the Void (New York: Palgrave, 2006; co-authored with Kenneth Womack).
 Kurt Vonnegut’s Crusade, or How a Postmodern Harlequin Preached a New Kind of Humanism (Albany: State University of New York Press, 2006).
 Reading the Beatles: Cultural Studies, Literary Criticism, and the Fab Four (Albany: State University of New York Press, 2006; co-edited with Kenneth Womack).
 The Critical Response to John Irving (Westport, CT: Praeger, 2004; co-edited with Kenneth Womack).
 Formalist Criticism and Reader-Response Theory (New York: Palgrave, 2002; co-authored with Kenneth Womack).
 Mapping the Ethical Turn: A Reader in Ethics, Culture, and Literary Theory (Charlottesville: University of Virginia Press, 2001; co-edited with Kenneth Womack).

External links 
 Todd F. Davis
 Writer's Almanac
 American Life in Poetry
 Mennonite Poetry

1965 births
Living people
American male poets
People from Elkhart, Indiana
American literary critics
American male non-fiction writers
21st-century American poets
21st-century American male writers